The Mixed technical routine competition of the 2018 European Aquatics Championships will be held on 3 August 2018.

Results
The final was held at 14:42.

References

Mixed technical routine